Dairyū Tadahiro (born 30 September 1960 as Tadahiro Nagamoto) is a former sumo wrestler from Osaka, Japan. He made his professional debut in May 1976, but never reached the top division. His highest rank was jūryō 4, which he reached in January 1990. He retired in July 1997 and became an elder in the Japan Sumo Association. He assumed the role of head coach of Ōtake stable in July 2010, shortly after former head coach (ex-sekiwake) Takatōriki was fired by the Sumo Association for betting illegally on baseball.

Career record

See also
Glossary of sumo terms
List of past sumo wrestlers
List of sumo elders

References

1960 births
Living people
Japanese sumo wrestlers
People from Osaka
Sumo people from Osaka Prefecture